Cold Dark Place is an EP by American metal band Mastodon. It was released digitally and on CD on September 22, 2017 via Reprise Records, and a limited-edition ten-inch vinyl followed on October 27. Three of the tracks were recorded during the recording sessions of 2014's Once More 'Round the Sun, while "Toe to Toes" was recorded during the recording sessions of 2017's Emperor of Sand.

Track listing

Personnel
 Brann Dailor − drums, percussion, vocals, claps (track 3)
 Brent Hinds − guitars, vocals, lap-steel, claps (track 3)
 Bill Kelliher − guitar & claps (track 3)
 Troy Sanders − bass, vocals, claps (track 3)
 Nick Raskulinecz − production (tracks 1, 2, and 4)
 Brendan O'Brien − production (track 3)

Charts

References

Mastodon (band) albums
2017 EPs